Kamienna Góra may refer to the following places:
Kamienna Góra in Lower Silesian Voivodeship (south-west Poland)
Kamienna Góra, Lublin Voivodeship (east Poland)
Kamienna Góra, Kielce County in Świętokrzyskie Voivodeship (south-central Poland)
Kamienna Góra, Opatów County in Świętokrzyskie Voivodeship (south-central Poland)
Kamienna Góra, Opole Voivodeship (south-west Poland)
Kamienna Góra, Kartuzy County in Pomeranian Voivodeship (north Poland)
Kamienna Góra, Sztum County in Pomeranian Voivodeship (north Poland)
Kamienna Góra, West Pomeranian Voivodeship (north-west Poland)